Red Bull Arena is a soccer-specific stadium in Harrison, New Jersey that is home to the New York Red Bulls of Major League Soccer and NJ/NY Gotham FC of the National Women's Soccer League. Featuring a transparent partial roof, it is located on the waterfront in the Riverbend District of Harrison across the Passaic River from Newark and approximately 7 miles (12 km) west of Lower Manhattan, New York City. With a seating capacity of 25,000, it is the sixth-largest soccer-specific stadium in the United States and in Major League Soccer.

Initial planning
The original plan, announced on July 1, 2004, was to move the MetroStars (as the New York Red Bulls were known at the time) from their home at Giants Stadium by the beginning of the 2006 season. Negotiations between MLS and the state of New Jersey dragged on until an agreement was announced on August 5, 2005, for the MetroStars to build and complete construction of a new dedicated soccer facility for the 2007 season. Concerns about environmental clean-up at the selected site forced another delay. Additionally, though the groundbreaking took place September 19, 2006 and construction was set for November 2007, that was delayed by one month when Red Bull GmbH bought the MetroStars from Anschutz Entertainment Group (AEG), changing the club's name in the process. After projections of opening during the 2008, and then the 2009 season, on January 23, 2009, it was announced that the arena opening would be delayed until 2010.

According to Erik Stover, Red Bulls managing director at the time, Harrison Redevelopment Agency chairman Peter B. Higgins was "quite simply the reason that the New York Red Bulls have a new home in Harrison. His vision and leadership guided us through numerous difficulties." The Higgins' contribution is memorialized by the naming of the street at the main gates along the west side of the stadium as Pete Higgins Boulevard.

Red Bull buyout and new design
In addition to purchasing the team, Red Bull bought out AEG's $100 million share of the stadium, an after-effect of lasting disagreements between the two corporations regarding their plans for the facility. Their differences prompted a significant delay in the early stages of the stadium's construction. After the naming rights of the soccer team were acquired, leading to the name Red Bull Park, Red Bull instituted a number of changes to the stadium's original design, which sparked tension between the Austrian-based energy drink company and AEG. Red Bull opted out of AEG's plan to construct a stage in the stadium for performances, one that would have increased profit margins for the group.

The updated design was completed by Rossetti architects from Detroit and was built by New Jersey-based Hunter Roberts Construction Group, LLC. The stadium's unique roofing system was engineered, fabricated, and installed by the projects specialty roofing contractor Birdair of Amherst, New York, a suburb of Buffalo.

Features
A tension-fabric curved exterior shell of PTFE fiberglass wraps around the entire two-tiered stadium, creating the distinguishing roof feature of Red Bull Arena. The low and enclosed roof design is known for providing superior acoustics by holding, amplifying and reflecting crowd noise back onto the field. Dual  light-emitting diode (LED) HD Panasonic video boards were suspended from the north and south ends of the roof. In early 2019, both video boards were replaced with two new  LED Daktronics displays as part of stadium wide upgrades.

The stadium's seating is raked at 33-degrees for optimal sight-lines. Included in the 25,000 seats are 30 luxury suites and 1,000 premium seats. The Red Bull logo is patterned in red and yellow lower level seats directly opposite the team benches and field entrance tunnel.

Sections 133, 101 & 102 collectively make up the 1,500 seat home supporters section known as the "South Ward". Among the blue seats in the South Ward was the "Red Seat" located at Section 101, Row 11, Seat 20. The Red Seat signifies the Red Bulls first goal scored at Red Bull Arena; Section 101 represents the Arena's first game, Row 11 marks the minute of the game in which the goal was scored and Seat 20 remembers the goal scorer, No. 20 Joel Lindpere. Following the passing of Empire Supporters Club member Mike Vallo, the Red Seat's No. 20 was replaced by the initials "MV" to honor him. Ahead of the 2020 season, the Red Bulls converted the South Ward into a safe standing section with a rail seating system, similar to the system in place at Banc of California Stadium in Los Angeles. This system allows supporters to watch matches while standing but also contain unlock-able individual red fold-down seats to convert the section to standard seating for international matches and other events. The rails also contain cup holders.  The Red Seat was removed and given to the Vallo Family and a new location in Section 101 will be selected to commemorate Mike Vallo. An open standing area was created directly behind the South Ward for supporters to gather while maintaining a view of the field. Red Bull Arena is the third soccer-specific stadium in North America to have a safe standing with rail seating system.

On the west side of Red Bull Arena is the "Red Ring of Honor". Established in 2015, the club's 20th season in Major League Soccer, the ring honors the 20 best players in the first 20 seasons of the club as voted by fans. Above the Red Ring of Honor is the retired jersey number "99" of striker Bradley Wright-Phillips; the first to be retired by the Red Bulls. Also above the Red Ring of Honor are listed the years honoring the teams that won the Supporters' Shield in 2013, 2015, and 2018.

The lower bowl of the stadium is constructed of concrete, while the upper bowl is constructed of galvanized-metal. The Red Bulls intentionally chose galvanized-metal for the upper bowl so fans could create more noise by stomping their feet. On the North side of the main concourse are 13 "Red Beams"; each one memorializing a special moment in the club's history.

In 2017, the Red Bulls opened MLS's first permanent sensory room for individuals and families affected by autism. The space was formerly used as executive offices by the club's general manager Marc de Grandpre, whose daughter is on the autism spectrum. The sensory room overlooks mid-field and features dimmed lighting and lightly-colored walls to offer a soothing environment, along with visual aids, fidget toys and other activities. There is no special ticket or any charge required for use of the room.

Construction

Construction commenced on Red Bull Park on January 3, 2008, on the site of a former Remco factory service building, including the first of 3,000 timber piles driven into the ground to support the new stadium. On January 11, 2008, Erik Stover was announced as the new general manager of Red Bull Arena during construction and then on after. He had served as GM of Qualcomm Stadium in San Diego since 2005. On February 20, 2008, a CAN$28–$30 million contract was announced with Structal-Heavy Steel Construction to assist in the fabrication and construction of steel components. Fabrication began offsite in the second quarter of 2008, and erection in Fall, 2008. Total project size is estimated at 9,000 tons of structural steel.

The first steel girder was put in place on August 19, 2008.  The arena was reported by The New York Times to be 55% complete on March 27, 2009.  The last major beam for the roof was topped out on April 14, 2009. Enclosure panels started going up on May 7, 2009. The first section of the Red Bull Arena roof was completed in August 2009. The underground drainage and turf-heating system installation began on August 18, 2009.

Tax controversy
In 2010, the Red Bulls refused to pay a $1.4 million property tax levy to the town of Harrison, claiming that the stadium was exempt from paying taxes.  The team also refused to pay a $1.3 million for 2011.  While the team did eventually pay the back taxes, it subsequently filed a lawsuit to have the payments reimbursed by the town, claiming the stadium was exempt from local taxes.

On June 30, 2012, the Tax Court of New Jersey ruled that Harrison did have the right to tax both Red Bull Arena and the land underneath it and denied the team's claim for reimbursement.  This decision was upheld by an appellate court in May 2014. The Red Bulls appealed to the state Supreme Court, who in October 2014 agreed to hear the case.  The Supreme Court referred the parties to mediation.

A settlement was proposed in which the Hudson County Improvement Authority would take over ownership of the land and stadium and enter into a lease agreement with the team, using the lease payments to give Harrison an annual PILOT (Payment In Lieu of Taxes) tied to the Consumer Price Index.  The settlement was approved by the Harrison Town Council and mayor on March 16, 2016.

On July 14, 2016, the Red Bulls and town agreed to a revised settlement, in which the stadium and land will be turned over to the Hudson County Improvement Authority. The Red Bulls will pay an annual rent of $1.3 million, escalated annually based on the Consumer Price Index, of which $1.115 million will go to the town of Harrison. The lease agreement will be in place through 2038, with team options through 2058. At the end of the lease term, ownership of the stadium will revert to the town. This agreement must be finalized by the end of 2016.

Events

Soccer

A soft opening of the stadium, a match between the Red Bulls Under-18 Academy team and the United States U-17 men's national soccer team scheduled for March 13, 2010, was postponed due to heavy rain and high wind. The facility instead opened on March 20, 2010 as the Red Bulls played a friendly match against Brazilian club Santos FC winning before a sold-out crowd 3–1.

The first official match, the MLS season opener against the Chicago Fire, took place March 27, 2010 with the Red Bulls winning 1–0 in front of a sold-out crowd. Joel Lindpere became the first player to score a goal at Red Bull Arena.

Red Bull Arena hosted its first-ever international soccer game in May 2010, when Turkey beat the Czech Republic in front of a crowd of 16,371. The stadium also hosted an exhibition between Ecuador and Colombia in October 2010. The game drew a sellout crowd of 25,000.

In addition, Red Bull Arena hosted the 2011 MLS All-Star Game on July 27 versus Manchester United.

On October 8, 2011, Red Bull Arena hosted its first New Jersey high school soccer game when the Harrison Blue Tide hosted the Kearny Kardinals in both boys' and girls' soccer matches.

On October 11, 2011 Red Bull Arena hosted its first United States men's national soccer team match, as the US squad lost 1–0 to the Ecuador national football team in an international friendly.

On November 13, 2011, Red Bull Arena hosted the semifinals and championship match of the 2011 Big East Conference Men's Soccer Tournament, a college soccer tournament. The 2012 Big East Men's Soccer Tournament was also held at Red Bull Arena.

On July 28, 2012, Red Bull Arena hosted the Trophée des champions, a soccer game between the champions of Ligue 1 and the winners of the Coupe de France: Montpellier HSC vs Olympique Lyonnais. Lyon won on penalties after the match ended 2–2. The match was organized by Ligue de Football Professionnel.

On June 20, 2013, the United States women's national soccer team played an international friendly against the South Korea women's national football team. It was in Red Bull Arena that United States forward Abby Wambach scored four goals, beating Mia Hamm's record for most international goals scored ever, male or female.

On October 27, 2013, the New York Red Bulls won their first ever Supporters' Shield championship by beating the Chicago Fire 5–2 in front of a sold-out crowd of 25,219.

On July 26, 2014, the New York Red Bulls defeated reigning FA Cup champions Arsenal F.C. 1–0 in the 2014 New York Cup in front of a sold-out crowd of 25,219.

On July 22, 2015, the New York Red Bulls defeated reigning Premier League champions Chelsea F.C. 4–2 as part of the 2015 International Champions Cup in front of a crowd of 24,076.

The New York Red Bulls II of the United Soccer League played their home games at Red Bull Arena from 2015 to 2016, then moved to Montclair State University's MSU Soccer Park at Pittser Field for the 2017 Season.

On August 12, 2016,  Major League Soccer, in collaboration with the United Soccer League and oversight by the International Football Association Board, made history by becoming the first soccer league ever to use video assistant referee (VAR) in a live match. The match was between New York Red Bulls II and Orlando City B at Red Bull Arena. During the match, referee Ismail Elfath reviewed two fouls and after consultation with video assistant referee Allen Chapman, issued a red card and a yellow card in the respective incidents. New York Red Bulls II won the match 5–1.

On October 23, 2016, Red Bull Arena hosted the 2016 United Soccer League Final with New York Red Bulls II beating the Swope Park Rangers 5–1 winning their first United Soccer League Championship. New York Red Bulls II became the first Major League Soccer-owned team to win the United Soccer League title.

On July 25, 2017, Red Bull Arena hosted Tottenham Hotspur and A.S. Roma as part of the 2017 International Champions Cup. A.S. Roma defeated Tottenham Hotspur 3–2 in front of a sold-out crowd of 26,192.

On September 1, 2017, Red Bull Arena hosted its first ever World Cup Qualifier Match between the United States and Costa Rica as part of the 2018 FIFA World Cup qualification – CONCACAF Fifth Round. The United States lost to Costa Rica 2–0 in front of a sold-out crowd of 26,500.

On September 24, 2017, the Danone Nations Cup World Final was held at Red Bull Arena. It marked the first time the international youth soccer tournament was held in the United States in its 18-year history.

On July 28, 2018, Red Bull Arena hosted S.L. Benfica and Juventus F.C. as part of the 2018 International Champions Cup. Juventus beat Benfica in a penalty shootout 4–2 in front of a crowd of 24,194.

On July 24, 2019, Red Bull Arena hosted Fiorentina and S.L. Benfica as part of the 2019 International Champions Cup. Benfica defeated Fiorentina 2–1.

Red Bull Arena gained a new tenant with the November 18, 2019 joint announcement by the Red Bulls and NJ/NY Gotham FC that the stadium would host the latter team for its home games in the National Women's Soccer League in 2020. Gotham had used Red Bull Arena for two home matches in its 2019 season, both of which drew crowds well beyond the capacity of that team's former home of Yurcak Field at Rutgers University.

In late 2020, Red Bull Arena hosted home matches for the Montreal Impact (later known as CF Montréal) due to cross-border travel restrictions amid the COVID-19 pandemic. The stadium also hosted cross-town rivals New York City FC from August to September due to scheduling conflicts at Yankee Stadium, which were resolved by October. The team had also played two 2020 CONCACAF Champions League fixtures at the stadium in February and March due to Yankee Stadium undergoing winterization procedures. 

In 2021, New York City FC played seven matches at Red Bull Arena due to other scheduling conflicts. In addition to NYCFC playing in Red Bull Arena, CF Montréal announced on June 21, 2021 that they would play a game against NYCFC on July 7 due to scheduling conflicts at DRV PNK Stadium with the 2021 CONCACAF Gold Cup.

On July 30, 2022, the New York Red Bulls played a club friendly against FC Barcelona in front of a sold-out crowd with Barcelona winning 2–0.
 
On November 13, 2022, the United States women's national soccer team played the Germany women's national football team in an international friendly with the US team winning 2–1 in front of a crowd of 26,317.

Rugby union
In addition to soccer, the arena has also been the host of several rugby union matches. All three finals of the 2010 Churchill Cup were held at The Red Bull Arena. London Irish played their home game against Saracens in Premiership Rugby at the Red Bull Arena on March 12, 2016. This marked the first time an English premiership rugby match had been played overseas. The timing and location were selected to coincide with St. Patrick's Day festivities in an area were there is a large Irish influence. The game was televised live across the US on NBCSN. London Irish did not return the following season due to their relegation to the RFU Championship. The USA faced Ireland on June 10, 2017. This was the Eagles' first test of the 2017 summer internationals. The Eagles lost 55–19 in front of 22,370 spectators.

On June 25, 2022, the arena hosted the 2022 Major League Rugby Final between Rugby New York and the Seattle Seawolves with Rugby New York winning the MLR Shield by a score of 30-15.

Lacrosse 
The Premier Lacrosse League held five matches over the course of two weekends at Red Bull Arena. Three regular season matches were held on June 8 and June 9, 2019 and drew a total 10,773 fans. Two second round playoff matches were held on September 14, 2019 and drew a total of 10,572 fans, which was the highest single day total attendance for the PLL. This was the first time that Red Bull Arena hosted lacrosse matches.

Concerts 
Red Bull Arena hosted its first-ever concert, with Dispatch on June 18, 2011. Following the concert the stadium was highly praised by the sold-out crowd and media for its sight-lines, sound, and acoustics.

On October 10, 2016, Red Bull Arena announced plans to regularly host concerts and live entertainment events beginning in 2017.

On September 24, 2017, as part of the festivities for the Danone Nations Cup World Final, DNCE closed out the tournament with a concert.

Community 
Covenant House – New Jersey, in conjunction with Horizon Blue Cross Blue Shield of New Jersey and the New York Red Bulls, have staged two "Sleep Outs" at Red Bull Arena in order to raise awareness and funds for New Jersey's homeless youth. The first was on October 17, 2014 and the second was on October 16, 2015.

On April 10, 2016, Red Bull Arena hosted thousands of Peruvian Americans from New Jersey and Pennsylvania to vote in the 2016 Peruvian general election. Citizens of Peru are entitled to vote in Peru's national elections regardless of where they reside.

On January 24, 2021, a drive-through COVID-19 testing site, with the capacity to test 2,400 people a day, opened in front of Red Bull Arena.

On May 26, 2022, Hudson County Community College held the commencement ceremonies for the classes of 2020, 2021 and 2022. The ceremonies were the first held for the school since 2019 due to the COVID-19 pandemic.

Other events
On October 24, 2021, RIX Magazine hosted the Allstar Fitment 3.0 auto show at Red Bull Arena.

Awards and recognition
In December 2010, the stadium was named "Project of the Year (Sports/Recreation)" by Engineering News-Record – New York.

In January 2016, Red Bull Arena was awarded Major League Soccer – "Security Staff of the Year" for 2015. The security staff was particularly recognized for its security plan for the Major League Soccer Eastern Conference Final during a heightened state of security worldwide following the November 2015 Paris attacks.

In August 2016, Red Bull Arena was awarded the first annual J.D. Power – "Best In Fan Experience" for 2016. The stadium was selected from all the pro sports and entertainment venues in the New York metropolitan area. Red Bull Arena scored highest for overall satisfaction, security and ushers, seating area and game experience, ticket purchase, food and beverage, and leaving the game.

Also in August 2016, Red Bull Arena and the Red Bull Training Facility were awarded the Sports Turf Managers Association's (STMA) Certification for Environmentally Responsible Management. The training facility is the first facility to earn the 80% or higher ratings on the 10-part written assessment.

In August 2017, Red Bull Arena and the Red Bulls were awarded their second consecutive J.D. Power – "Best in Fan Experience" award for the New York metropolitan area. The stadium scored highest for ticket purchase, security and ushers, seating area and game experience, food and beverage and game arrival.

In November 2018, Red Bull Arena and Director of Grounds, Dan Shemesh, were honored with the "Field of the Year" award by the Sports Turf Managers Association (STMA) for the professional soccer division.

In April 2021, Red Bull Arena received Global Biorisk Advisory Council (GBAC) STAR accreditation ahead of the 2021 home opener. GBAC STAR is recognized as the gold standard of safe venues and provides third-party validation to ensure the implementation of rigorous protocols in response to biorisk situations such as COVID-19. Upgrades made to receive the accreditation include an ionized air filtration system, making all restrooms contactless, quarterly antimicrobial treatments, and implementing contact free food order and payment systems.

Accessibility and transportation
The stadium can be reached via the Harrison station by the Newark-World Trade Center train of the PATH rapid transit system. A $256 million reconstruction and expansion, to accommodate the burgeoning economic growth and development in the area and the increasing number of fans taking the PATH on game days, was completed on June 15, 2019. A complementary New York Red Bulls shuttle bus service is available on game days from nearby Newark Penn Station and New Jersey Transit's Newark Broad Street Station to transport fans to and from Red Bull Arena. The stadium is also served by the 40 New Jersey Transit Bus route.

The nearby Jackson Street Bridge crosses the Passaic River to the Ironbound neighborhood in Newark and is a popular pedestrian route to and from the stadium.

Red Bull Arena is accessible by car via I-280, with connections to the New Jersey Turnpike (I-95), Garden State Parkway, McCarter Highway (NJ-21), and other highways and roads. There are several designated lots and the Harrison Parking Center garage available for parking in the immediate vicinity.

References

External links

 
 Red Bull Arena (Harrison) at StadiumDB.com
 Across the Hudson: Red Bull Park  by Curbed.com
 Interactive guide NY Times

New York Red Bulls
Red Bull
CONCACAF Gold Cup stadiums
Churchill Cup
Major League Soccer stadiums
Premier Lacrosse League venues
Lacrosse venues in the United States
Rugby league in New York (state)
Rugby union stadiums in the United States
Soccer venues in New Jersey
Soccer venues in the New York metropolitan area
Sports venues completed in 2010
Sports in Hudson County, New Jersey
Tourist attractions in Hudson County, New Jersey
Harrison, New Jersey
2010 establishments in New Jersey
National Women's Soccer League stadiums
NJ/NY Gotham FC